State Route 182 (SR 182) is a state highway in the U.S. state of California in Mono County. The route connects U.S. Route 395 in Bridgeport to Nevada State Route 338 at the Nevada state line via the East Walker River valley.

Route description
SR 182 begins at an intersection with U.S. Route 395 in the small town of Bridgeport. The road then exits the town and traverses the east edge of the Bridgeport Reservoir, which is located along the East Walker River. Upon leaving the reservoir, the route enters the Toiyabe National Forest and while paralleling the East Walker River. After several miles, the road finds its end at the Nevada state line. The road continues northeastward as Nevada State Route 338.

SR 182 is not part of the National Highway System, a network of highways that are considered essential to the country's economy, defense, and mobility by the Federal Highway Administration.

Major intersections

See also

References

External links

Caltrans: Route 182 highway conditions
California Highways: Route 182
California @ AARoads.com - State Route 182

182
State Route 182
Humboldt–Toiyabe National Forest